18650 may refer to:

 18650 battery, a form factor size for rechargeable lithium-ion battery cylindrical cells
 (18650) 1998 FX10; a main-belt asteroid, Asteroid 18650, the 18650th asteroid registered, see List of minor planets: 18001–19000
 ISO 18650, an international standard on construction, see List of International Organization for Standardization standards, 18000-19999

See also

 
 1865 (disambiguation)